The 2003 St Albans City and District Council election took place on 1 May 2003 to elect members of St Albans District Council in Hertfordshire, England. One third of the council was up for election and the council stayed under no overall control.

After the election, the composition of the council was:
Liberal Democrats 23
Conservative 21
Labour 13
Independent 1

Background
Following the last election in 2002 the Conservatives were the largest party with 21 seats, compared to 20 for the Liberal Democrats, 15 for Labour, 1 independent and 1 seat was vacant. However the Liberal Democrats gained a seat from the Conservatives at a by-election in Verulam, which meant that going into the 2003 election both the Conservatives and Liberal Democrats needed to gain 8 seats to win a majority.

Voting trial
The election saw a trial of various voting methods. Voters could choose between e-voting, either by computer or on a touchscreen at a polling booth, voting by phone or by post, or on a traditional ballot paper. The period for voting was also increased to allow voting from the 28 April to the 1 May 2003.

However problems occurred at 15 polling stations where the system did not recognise voters pin numbers, which meant that traditional paper ballots had to be used in those polling stations. The issues meant the election nearly had to be voided, with the count only able to start over 3 hours after polls had closed.

However turnout was up by 5% on the previous election in 2002 at 43%.

Election result
The Liberal Democrats gained 2 seats from Labour to become the largest party on the council with 23 councillors. The Conservatives remained on 21 seats and there was still 1 independent, while the losses for Labour in Ashley and St Peter's wards reduced them to 13 seats.

Following the election the Liberal Democrat group on the council chose Robert Donald as their new leader taking over from Brian Peyton.

Ward results

By-elections between 2003 and 2004
A by-election was held in Verulam ward on 5 April 2004 after the resignation of Conservative councillor Pauline Buffham, who was moving abroad. The seat was gained for the Liberal Democrats by Susan Campbell with a majority of 265 votes over the Conservatives.

References

2003
2003 English local elections
2000s in Hertfordshire